Yakety Yak, Take it Back is a 1991 celebrity charity music video film aimed at encouraging recycling using a combination of live action rock stars, rappers, and animated Warner Bros. characters.

The film originally aired on MTV in a shortened music video form and was released in an extended version on home video. The film was also released in Episode 3043 of Sesame Street.

References

External links

1991 films
Music videos
1990s English-language films
1991 animated films
1990s American animated films
1990s musical films
Public service announcements of the United States